Dan Mandich (born June 12, 1960) is a Canadian retired professional ice hockey defenceman who played 111 games in the National Hockey League for the Minnesota North Stars between 1982 and 1985.

Mandich was born in Brantford, Ontario.

Career statistics

Regular season and playoffs

Awards and honours

References

External links
 

1960 births
Living people
Birmingham South Stars players
Canadian ice hockey defencemen
Minnesota North Stars players
Nashville South Stars players
Ohio State Buckeyes men's ice hockey players
Ice hockey people from Ontario
Salt Lake Golden Eagles (CHL) players
Sportspeople from Brantford
Springfield Indians players
Canadian people of Serbian descent
Undrafted National Hockey League players
Windsor Spitfires players